Marissa Garrido Arozamena (May 30, 1926 – January 8, 2021) was a Mexican telenovela playwright and writer who was most active in the 1960s, 1970s and 1980s. She wrote forty-five adaptations and sixty-five original stories for television. Her most successful creation was La leona in 1961. The last telenovela she wrote was Besos prohibidos for TV Azteca in 1999. She was the sister of Mexican actress Amparo Garrido.

Biography
From a family of artists, Marissa Garrido was born in Mexico City, May 30, 1926. She lived in the old Barrio del Carmen, although she traveled continuously for the artistic career of her parents. Her father was Juan S. Garrido, a Chilean composer living in Mexico, and her mother was the Mexican actress, Carmen Arozamena Sánchez, a former member of a theatrical group called "Las Hermanas Arozamena." Her maternal grandfather was Eduardo "Nanche" Arozamena Lira, a representative singer and actor during the Golden Age of Mexican cinema. Her sister, Amparo Garrido Arozamena, her uncle, Eduardo Arozamena Pasarón, as well as most of her family, worked as actors in radionovelas (radio soap opera), theater and dubbing.

As a child, Garrido was interested in the arts and studied piano. She was a student at the Conservatorio Nacional de Música. She also formally studied social work at the San Ildefonso College. She soon became interested in writing radionovelas for XEX-AM and thereafter, she changed the direction of her life. Her mother, Carmen, tried to discourage Garrido and her sisters from joining this artistic environment because it did not offer a stable job, being an activity that today is known as freelancer.

Garrido died in Mexico City from a severe respiratory complication caused by COVID-19 on January 8, 2021, at the age of 94.

Works

Original stories

Radionovelas 

 Diario de una mujer (with Prudencia Grifell )
 Corazón salvaje (of Caridad Bravo Adams)
 Al grito de la sangre (with Carmen Montejo)
 El hombre del paraguas
 Teatro familiar azteca
 Puerta al suspenso
 Mujeres célebres
 Por el ojo de la cerradura
 Sor Amparo
 Cita con Mauricio Garcés
 Un cuento para usted
 El pan de los pobres
 Culpas ajenas
 Lo que callan las mujeres

Telenovelas 

 Besos prohibidos (1999)
 Azul Tequila (1998)
 Encadenados (1988)
 Pasión y poder (1988)
 Angélica (1985)
 En busca del paraíso (1982)
 Juegos del destino (1981) (with Arturo Moya Grau)
 Quiéreme siempre (1981)
 No temas al amor (1980)
 Querer volar (1980)
 Yara (1979)
 Paloma (1975)
 Barata de primavera (1975)
 La tierra (1974)
 Ha llegado una intrusa (1974)
 Duelo de Pasiones (1968)
 Entre sombras (1967)
 El juicio de nuestros hijos (1967)
 La razón de vivir (1966)
 Secreto de confesión (1965)
 Destino (1963)
 La leona (1961)
 Niebla (1961)
 Las gemelas (1961)

With Fernanda Villeli
 El amor ajeno (1983)
 Pasiones encendidas (1978)
 Pecado de amor (1978)
 Pacto de amor (1977)
 Mañana será otro día (1976)
 Mundos opuestos (1975)
 Entre brumas (1973)
 Muchacha italiana viene a casarse (1971-1973)

Adaptations 

 Vida robada (1991)
 Secreto de confesión (1980)
 Una mujer marcada (1979)
 Puente de amor (1969)

With others
 La jefa del campeón (2018) - with Ximena Suárez; original by Héctor Rodríguez and Alejandro Torres
 Háblame de amor (1999) - original by Eric Vonn
 Azul (1996) - original by Pinkye Morris
 Mi pequeña Soledad (1990) - with René Muñoz; original by Jorge Lozano Soriano

Literary editions 
 Imperio de cristal (1994) written with Jaime García Estrada and Orlando Merino
 Flor y canela (1988) - original by Benito Pérez Galdós
 Mi rival (1973) - original by Inés Rodena
 Muchacha italiana viene a casarse (1971) - original by Delia González Márquez
 Sueña conmigo, Donaji (1967) - original by Caridad Bravo Adams

Books 
 Pensamientos, sentimientos, historias. (2011) Compilation: Silvia Castillejos Peral. SOGEM-Chapingo

References

1926 births
2021 deaths
Writers from Mexico City
Telenovela writers
Women soap opera writers
20th-century Mexican dramatists and playwrights
Mexican screenwriters
20th-century Mexican women writers
21st-century Mexican writers
21st-century Mexican women writers
Deaths from the COVID-19 pandemic in Mexico